The Romanian women's national team represents Romania in senior women's international handball and is controlled by the Romanian Handball Federation, the governing body for handball in Romania. It competes in the three major international tournaments; the Olympic Games, the IHF World Championship and the EHF European Championship. 

Since first entering World Championship, Romania are the only team to have appeared in all 25 tournaments to date. 

They were crowned winners in the IHF World Championship three times: 1956, 1960 and 1962, and finished as runners-up in 1973 and 2005 and also finished third in 2015. Since first entering in 1994, Romania have never won the EHF European Championship, with their best performances being a third-place finish in 2010.

Honors
IHF World Championship 
 Gold medalists: 1956, 1960, 1962 
 Silver medalists: 1973, 2005
 Bronze medalists: 2015

EHF European Championship
 Bronze medalists: 2010

Other awards
GF World Cup
 Gold medalists: 2009, 2010
 Silver medalists: 2006

Competitions

Olympic Games

World Championship 
Since their first appearance in 1957, Romania has participated in 25 World Championships. They were crowned world champions for the first time in 1962 after beating Denmark (8–5) in the final.

European Championship

GF World Cup
 GF World Cup '05 – 4th
 GF World Cup '06 – 2nd
 GF World Cup '07 – 5th
 GF World Cup '08 – 8th
 GF World Cup '09 – Winner
 GF World Cup '10 – Winner

Team

Current squad
Squad for the 2022 European Women's Handball Championship.

Head coach: Florentin Pera

Notable players
IHF World Player of the Year
 Cristina Neagu (left back), 2010, 2015, 2016 and 2018

EHF Player of the Year
 Cristina Neagu (left back), 2017, 2018

MVP
 Cristina Neagu (left back), 2015 World Championship

All-Star Team members
Irina Klimovschi (goalkeeper), 1956 World Championship, 1960 World Championship 
Doina Furcoi-Solomonov (pivot), 1975 World Championship 
Mariana Tîrcă (right back), 1995 World Championship 
Luminiţa Dinu (goalkeeper), 2000 European Championship, 2005 World Championship 
Valentina Ardean-Elisei (left wing), 2005 World Championship, 2008 European Championship, 2015 World Championship
Ionela Stanca (pivot), 2007 World Championship 
Ramona Farcău (right wing), 2008 Summer Olympics 
Cristina Neagu (left back), 2010 European Championship, 2014 European Championship, 2016 European Championship, 2015 World Championship
Crina Pintea (pivot), 2018 European Championship 

Top scorers 
Victoria Dumitrescu (left back), 1956 World Championship
Carmen Amariei (left back), 1999 World Championship  
Simona Gogîrlă (left back), 2000 European Championship  
Ramona Farcău (right wing), 2008 Summer Olympics 
Cristina Vărzaru (right wing), 2009–2010 EHF Champions League 
Cristina Neagu (left back), 2010 European Championship, 2015 World Championship, 2014–2015 EHF Champions League, 2017–2018 EHF Champions League, 2019-2020 EHF Champions League, 2020-2021 EHF Champions League, 2021-2022 EHF Champions League

Other notable players
Cristina Petrovici
Simona Arghir-Sandu
Maria Török-Duca
Valentina Cozma 
Steluța Luca  

Medal leaders 
World Championship

Coaching history

Individual all-time records

Most matches played
Total number of matches played in official competitions only.

Last updated: 29 September 2019

Most goals scored
Total number of goals scored in official matches only.

Last updated: 29 September 2019

See also
Romania women's national youth handball team
Romania women's national junior handball team
Romania men's national handball team

References

External links

IHF profile

National team
Women's national handball teams
H